Qurdarik, also rendered as Qurdik, may refer to:
 Qurdarik-e Olya
 Qurdarik-e Sofla